The New Zealand Warriors 2001 season was the New Zealand Warriors' 7th first-grade season, and their first under the new name. The club competed in Australasia's National Rugby League. The coach of the team was Daniel Anderson while Stacey Jones and Kevin Campion were the club's co-captains. The club made the final series for the first time, after finishing eighth in the regular season.

Milestones
4 March — Round 3: Ali Lauitiiti played in his 50th match for the club.
24 March — Round 6: The Warriors defeat Brisbane for the first time, 13–12.
16 June — Round 16: Jason Death played in his 50th match for the club.
24 June — Round 17: Awen Guttenbeil played in his 50th match for the club.
15 July — Round 19: Logan Swann played in his 100th match for the club.
27 August — Round 25: The club reaches the play-offs for the first time when a 24–24 draw with Melbourne secures a finals berth.

The Sale
In November 2000 Tainui sold many of the clubs assets to businessman Eric Watson. This purchase included the clubs NRL license, the intellectual property rights and the training base but controversially did not include the player contracts.

The club was re-branded as the New Zealand Warriors, with new colours of black and grey — resembling the national sporting colours. Mick Watson was hired as CEO while little known coach Daniel Anderson was appointed head coach.

Jersey & Sponsors

Fixtures

The Warriors used Ericsson Stadium as their home ground in 2001, their only home ground since they entered the competition in 1995.

Pre Season trials

Regular season

Final Series

Ladder

Squad

Twenty Seven players were used by the Warriors in 2001, including three players who made their first grade debuts.

Staff
Chief executive officer: Mick Watson

Coaching Staff
Head coach: Daniel Anderson
Assistant coach: Tony Kemp
Video analysis: Rohan Smith

Transfers

Gains

Losses

Other Teams
Players not required by the Warriors each week were released to play in the 2001 Bartercard Cup. This included Anthony Seuseu, Iafeta Paleaaesina, Cliff Beverley, Shontayne Hape, Jason Temu, Motu Tony, Jonathan Smith, Justin Murphy, Mark Tookey and Kevin Campion who all played in the Bartercard Cup and the National Rugby League in 2001.

Awards
Jerry Seuseu won the club's Player of the Year award.

References

External links
Warriors official site
2001 Warriors Season at rugbyleagueproject.org

New Zealand Warriors seasons
New Zealand Warriors season
War